Efecto Dominó is an album by Chetes, released on April 15, 2008. The album received a Latin Grammy Award for Best Rock Solo Vocal Album.

Track list
All songs written by Chetes except where noted:

Efecto Dominó (4:10)
Fuera de Lugar (3:36)
Querer (3:38)
Quédate (Chetes/ Ken Coomer/ Charlie Brocco) (3:32)
La Primera Vez (4:09)
Destino (4:12)
Canción Optimista (2:29)
Sobrenatural (3:09)
Blues Del Diablo (3:18)
Ahora (3:17)
Como Lo Siento (9:00)

Musicians
 Chetes: vocals, acoustic guitar, bariton guitar, nylon string guitar, electric guitar,  resonator guitar, optigan, harpsichord, banjo on "La primera vez", string arrangements for "Ahora", toy piano, stylophone, rhodes, mellotron, piano
 Ken Coomer: production, drums except on "Sobrenatural" and "Blues del Diablo", percussion, glockenspiel on "Quedate", Walkie Talkie Radio on "La primera vez"
 Fred Eltringham: drums on "Sobrenatural" and "Blues del Diablo"
 Peter Stround: electric guitar, nylon string guitar on "Querer"
 Audley Freed: electric guitar
 Tim Marks: bass
 Rami Yaffee: organ, piano, wurlitzer, harmonium, chamberlin strings on "Destino", vibraphone on "Como lo Siento"
 Chris Carmichel: cello
 Keith Gattis: pedal steel guitar
 Scotty Huff: trumpet, flugelhomy and whistling on "La primera vez"
 Sarah Hays: backup vocals on "Blues del Diablo"
 Charlie Brocco: production, backup vocals on "Blues del Diablo"
 Jonathan Brocco: saxophone on bonus track of “Como Lo Siento”

References

2008 albums
Chetes albums
Spanish-language albums